The 2000–01 Fresno State Bulldogs men's basketball team represented California State University, Fresno during the 2000–01 NCAA Division I men's basketball season. This was head coach Jerry Tarkanian's sixth season at Fresno State. The Bulldogs played their home games at Selland Arena and were members of the Western Athletic Conference. They finished the season 26–7, 13–3 in WAC play to finish in first place. They defeated Tulsa to win the WAC tournament and earn the conference's automatic bid to the NCAA tournament. The Bulldogs beat No. 8 seed  in the first round before losing to No. 1 seed and eventual Final Four participant Michigan State.

Roster

Schedule and results
Source

|-
!colspan=9 style=| Non-conference regular season

|-
!colspan=9 style=| WAC regular season

|-
!colspan=9 style=| WAC tournament

|-
!colspan=9 style=| NCAA tournament

Awards and honors
Melvin Ely – WAC Player of the Year

References

Fresno State
Fresno State Bulldogs men's basketball seasons
Fresno State Bulldogs men's bask
Fresno State Bulldogs men's bask
Fresno State